Joseph Ferris (October 10, 1934 – June 20, 2020) was an American politician who served in the New York State Assembly from the 51st district from 1975 to 1984.

Ferris died from COVID-19 during the COVID-19 pandemic in New York City on June 20, 2020, in Brooklyn, New York City, New York at age 85.

References

1934 births
2020 deaths
Democratic Party members of the New York State Assembly
Deaths from the COVID-19 pandemic in New York (state)